Jim Courier was the defending champion but did not compete that year.

Wayne Ferreira won in the final 2–6, 6–3, 6–3 against Marcelo Ríos.

Seeds

  Wayne Ferreira (champion)
  Todd Martin (second round)
  MaliVai Washington (first round)
  Albert Costa (quarterfinals)
  Gilbert Schaller (first round)
  Marcelo Ríos (final)
  Magnus Larsson (second round)
  Jonas Björkman (second round)

Draw

Finals

Top half

Bottom half

External links
 Main draw

1996
1996 ATP Tour
1996 Tennis Channel Open